Loreto College is a Roman Catholic secondary school and sixth form for girls located near the centre of St Albans, Hertfordshire, England. It achieved Specialist Status in the Humanities in 2005 and became an academy in August 2012.

The college has around 1000 pupils on its roll, including 190 in the sixth form, with many pupils coming from a wide geographical area. It expanded to 5 forms of entry (from 4 in previous years) in September 2007.

In 2006, 2009 and 2013, the college was rated "Outstanding" by Ofsted, achieving grade one in all categories.

History
Founded by the Loreto Sisters, the college had just seven pupils when it first opened in 1922. The Sisters had bought a building called "The Elms" to use as a convent before opening the school.

Grammar school
During the Second World War, the gymnasium become an air-raid shelter and makeshift dormitories by night. American soldiers billeted in St Albans used the school's hockey pitch to train.

Comprehensive
It turned comprehensive in 1978.

Notable former pupils

 Sally Bretton (nee Davis), actress
 Siobhán Fahey, singer with 1980s pop group Bananarama (second-highest selling British female group, with over 40 million records, after the Spice Girls), then Shakespears Sister in the 1990s
 Shona McGarty, actress who plays Whitney Dean in EastEnders
 Claire Ward, Labour MP from 1997 to 2010 for Watford

References

External links
 School website

Educational institutions established in 1922
Secondary schools in Hertfordshire
Girls' schools in Hertfordshire
Catholic secondary schools in the Archdiocese of Westminster
1922 establishments in England
Schools in St Albans
St Albans
Academies in Hertfordshire